Thomas Carmody (October 9, 1859 in Milo, Yates County, New York – January 22, 1922 in New Rochelle, Westchester County, New York) was an American lawyer and politician.

Life
He graduated from Cornell Law School, and was admitted to the bar in 1886. He was District Attorney of Yates County from 1889 to 1893, and Chief Examiner of the State Civil Service Commission from 1893 to 1896. He was a delegate to the 1904 and 1912 Democratic National Conventions.

He was New York Attorney General from 1911 to 1914, elected in 1910 and 1912. In 1913, he got involved in a controversy with zoo director William Temple Hornaday over the Federal Migratory Bird law which in Carmody's opinion was unconstitutional. On July 20, 1914, he announced his and First Deputy Attorney General Joseph A. Kellogg's resignation to take effect on September 1, and their intention to open a law firm with State Senator George A. Blauvelt at 61 Broadway in New York City.

He caught a cold while trying a case at White Plains, New York and died four days later of pneumonia at his home at 95 Locust Avenue in New Rochelle.

Sources
The Political Graveyard: Index to Politicians: Carmicle to Carnevale at politicalgraveyard.com Political Graveyard
 The bird law controversy, in NYT on December 22, 1913
 The announcement of resignation, in NYT on July 21, 1914
 Obit notice in NYT on January 23, 1922

1859 births
1922 deaths
Politicians from New Rochelle, New York
People from Yates County, New York
Cornell Law School alumni
County district attorneys in New York (state)
New York State Attorneys General
Deaths from pneumonia in New York (state)
Lawyers from New Rochelle, New York
19th-century American lawyers